Sisu is a Finnish concept of stoic determination and tenacity. 

Sisu or SISU may also refer to:

Arts and entertainment
 Sisu (album), a 1998 album by Finnish jazz pianist Iiro Rantala
 Sisu (band), an American indie rock band
 Sisu production, a Canadian media and film production company
 Starship Sisu, in the book Citizen of the Galaxy by Robert A. Heinlein
 Sisu (Raya and the Last Dragon), a dragon character in Raya and the Last Dragon
 Sisu (film), a 2022 Finnish action film

Transportation and military
 Sisu 1A, an American competition sailplane
 Sisu Auto, a Finnish truck manufacturer

Ships
 Sisu-class motor torpedo boat (1919–1942), of the Finnish Navy
 Sisu (1938 icebreaker), a Finnish ship
 Sisu (1976 icebreaker), a Finnish ship

Other uses
 Sisu (candy), a Finnish brand of candy
 Mount Sisu, a mountain in Antarctica
 SISU BK, a Danish basketball club
 SiSU (Structured information, serialized units), a Unix framework
 Dalbergia sissoo or sisu, a hardy deciduous rosewood tree 
 Shanghai International Studies University, in China
 Sichuan International Studies University, in Chongqing, China

See also
 
 Suomen Sisu, a Finnish association
 La Familia (rap group) or Sișu & Puya, a Romanian hip hop group